Jordi Grimau Gragera (born 17 June 1983 in Barcelona) is a Spanish professional basketball player for Chocolates Trapa Palencia of the LEB Oro.

Player career 
2000–01  FC Barcelona (youth team)
2001–02  FC Barcelona
2002–03  Caprabo Lleida
2003–04  Aguas Valencia
2004–05  CB Tarragona
2005–06  TAU Cerámica
2006–07  Alerta Cantabria
2007–11  Assignia Manresa
2011–14  UCAM Murcia
2012–13 → Blancos de Rueda Valladolid
2014–16  Gipzukoa Basket
2016–17  Movistar Estudiantes
2017–present  Chocolates Trapa Palencia

Honours 

TAU Cerámica

Copa del Rey: 1
2006

External links
ACB Jordi Grimau Profile
Basketpedya.com Profile

1983 births
Living people
Bàsquet Manresa players
Cantabria Baloncesto players
CB Estudiantes players
CB Murcia players
CB Tarragona players
CB Valladolid players
FC Barcelona Bàsquet players
Gipuzkoa Basket players
Liga ACB players
Palencia Baloncesto players
Saski Baskonia players
Shooting guards
Spanish men's basketball players
Basketball players from Barcelona